Gabriela is a 1975 Brazilian telenovela based on the 1958 novel of the same name by Jorge Amado, starring Sônia Braga in the title role.

A remake was produced and aired by Globo in 2012, with Juliana Paes playing the lead role.

Plot 
Walter George Durst's free adaptation of Jorge Amado's novel Gabriela, Cravo e Canela (1958), takes place in 1925, when a devastating drought forces the hungry populations of the Brazilian Northeast to emigrate in search of survival. In the novel, the destination is Ilhéus, in the south of Bahia, a region in expansion thanks to the planting and commerce of cacao. Gabriela (Sônia Braga) is one of the victims of the drought. Free and impulsive, she gets a job as a cook at the home of the "Turkish" Nacib (Armando Bógus), with whom she lives a sensual love story.

Background 
Gabriela was created to give time for the production of the telenovela O Rebu, by Braulio Pedroso, but O Rebu ended up being aired first, and Gabriela was aired to celebrate the ten year anniversary of TV Globo.

Producer Daniel Filho said that during the search for the ideal woman to take the role of Gabriela, they first tried something unusual, offering the role to Gal Costa, but the singer from Bahia declined, claiming she did not know how to act. Afterwards, numerous tests were done, but the director decided that the role would have to go to Sônia Braga after seeing her performance in Caminhos do Coração – Caso Especial, written and directed by Domingos Oliveira in 1971, and insisted with  that she be chosen. The actress ended up strongly identified with the character, and would reprise the role again in the 1983 film Gabriela, directed by Bruno Barreto, acting alongside the Italian Marcello Mastroianni.

Gabriela was the first Brazilian telenovela to air in Portugal in May 1977, on RTP, and established Sônia Braga as a sex symbol.

Cast

References

External links 
 Gabriela at IMDb

1975 telenovelas
TV Globo telenovelas
Brazilian telenovelas
1975 Brazilian television series debuts
1975 Brazilian television series endings
Television shows based on Brazilian novels
Portuguese-language telenovelas